A playground, playpark, or play area is a place designed to provide an environment for children that facilitates play, typically outdoors. While a playground is usually designed for children, some are designed for other age groups, or people with disabilities. A playground might exclude children below (or above) a certain age.

Modern playgrounds often have recreational equipment such as the seesaw, merry-go-round, swingset, slide, jungle gym, chin-up bars, sandbox, spring rider, trapeze rings, playhouses, and mazes, many of which help children develop physical coordination, strength, and flexibility, as well as providing recreation and enjoyment and supporting social and emotional development. Common in modern playgrounds are play structures that link many different pieces of equipment.

Playgrounds often also have facilities for playing informal games of adult sports, such as a baseball diamond, a skating arena, a basketball court, or a tether ball.

Public playground equipment installed in the play areas of parks, schools, childcare facilities, institutions, multiple family dwellings, restaurants, resorts, and recreational developments, and other areas of public use.

A type of playground called a playscape is designed to provide a safe environment for play in a natural setting.

History

Through history, children played in their villages and neighbourhoods, especially in the streets and lanes near their homes.

In the 19th century, developmental psychologists such as Friedrich Fröbel proposed playgrounds as a developmental aid, or to imbue children with a sense of fair play and good manners. In Germany, a few playgrounds were erected in connection to schools. Thomas Carlyle called for the establishment of public playgrounds within industrial cities such as Manchester, England, in Past and Present (1843), saying that "every toiling Manchester" ought to have "a hundred acres or so of free greenfield, with trees on it, conquered, for its little children to disport in". Manchester became the site of the first purpose-built public-access playground, which opened in a park in 1859.

Response to Mass motorisation

However, it was only in the early 20th century, as the street lost its role as the default public space and became planned for use by motor cars, that momentum built to remove children from the new dangers and confine them to segregated areas to play. In the United States, organisations such as the National Highway Protective Society highlighted the numbers killed by automobiles, and urged the creation of playgrounds, aiming to free streets for vehicles rather than children's play. The Outdoor Recreation League provided funds to erect playgrounds on parkland, especially following the 1901 publication of a report on numbers of children being run down by cars in New York City.

In tandem with the new concern about the danger of roads, educational theories of play, including by Herbert Spencer and John Dewey inspired the emergence of the reformist playground movement, which argued that playgrounds had educational value, improved attention in class, enhanced physical health, and reduced truancy. Interventionist programs such as by the child savers sought to move children into controlled areas to limit 'delinquency'. Meanwhile, at schools and settlement houses for poorer children with limited access to education, health services and daycare, playgrounds were included to support these institutions' goal of keeping children safe and out of trouble. 

One of the first playgrounds in the United States was built in San Francisco's Golden Gate Park in 1887. In 1906 the Playground Association of America was founded and a year later Luther Gulick became president. It later became the National Recreation Association and then the National Recreation and Park Association. Urging the need for playgrounds, former President Theodore Roosevelt stated in 1907:

City streets are unsatisfactory playgrounds for children because of the danger, because most good games are against the law, because they are too hot in summer, and because in crowded sections of the city they are apt to be schools of crime. Neither do small back yards nor ornamental grass plots meet the needs of any but the very small children. Older children who would play vigorous games must have places especially set aside for them; and, since play is a fundamental need, playgrounds should be provided for every child as much as schools. This means that they must be distributed over the cities in such a way as to be within walking distance of every boy and girl, as most children can not afford to pay carfare.

In post war London the landscape architect and children's rights campaigner Lady Allen of Hurtwood introduced and popularised the concept of the ’junk playground’ - where the equipment was constructed from the recycled junk and rubble left over from the Blitz. She campaigned for facilities for children growing up in the new high-rise developments in Britain's cities and wrote a series of illustrated books on the subject of playgrounds, and at least one book on adventure playgrounds, spaces for free creativity by children, which helped the idea spread worldwide.

Playgrounds in the Soviet Union

Playgrounds were an integral part of urban culture in the USSR. In the 1970s and 1980s, there were playgrounds in almost every park in many Soviet cities. Playground apparatus was reasonably standard all over the country; most of them consisted of metallic bars with relatively few wooden parts, and were manufactured in state-owned factories. Some of the most common constructions were the carousel, sphere, seesaw, rocket, bridge, etc.

Design

Playground design is influenced by the intended purpose and audience.  Separate play areas might be offered to accommodate very young children.  Single, large, open parks tend to not to be used by older schoolgirls or less aggressive children, because there is little opportunity for them to escape more aggressive children.  By contrast, a park that offers multiple play areas is used equally by boys and girls.

Effects on child development

Professionals recognize that the social skills that children develop on the playground often become lifelong skill sets that are carried forward into their adulthood. Independent research concludes that playgrounds are among the most important environments for children outside the home. Most forms of play are essential for healthy development, but free, spontaneous play—the kind that occurs on playgrounds—is the most beneficial type of play.

Exciting, engaging and challenging playground equipment is important to keep children happy while still developing their learning abilities. These should be developed in order to suit different groups of children for different stages of learning, such as specialist playground equipment for nursery & pre-school children teaching them basic numeracy & vocabulary, to building a child's creativity and imagination with role play panels or puzzles.

There is a general consensus that physical activity reduces the risk of psychological problems in children and fosters their self-esteem. The American Chief Medical Officer's report (Department of Health, 2004), stated that a review of available research suggests that the health benefits of physical activity in children are predominantly seen in the amelioration of risk factors for disease, avoidance of weight gain, achieving a peak bone mass and mental well-being.

Exercise programmes "may have short term beneficial effects on self esteem in children and adolescents" although high-quality trials are lacking.

Commentators argue that the quality of a child's exercise experience can affect their self-esteem. Ajzen TPB (1991) promotes the notion that children's self-esteem is enhanced through the encouragement of physical mastery and self-development. It can be seen that playgrounds provide an ideal opportunity for children to master physical skills, such as learning to swing, balance and climb. Personal development may be gained through the enhancement of skills, such as playing, communicating and cooperating with other children and adults in the playground.

It can also be seen that public and private playgrounds act as a preventative health measure amongst young people because they promote physical activity at a stage in children's lives when they are active and not yet at risk from opting out of physical activity.

Children have devised many playground games and pastimes. But because playgrounds are usually subject to adult supervision and oversight, young children's street culture often struggles to fully thrive there. Research by Robin Moore concluded shown that playgrounds need to be balanced with marginal areas that (to adults) appear to be derelict or wasteground but to children they are areas that they can claim for themselves, ideally a wooded area or field.

For many children, it is their favorite time of day when they get to be on the playground for free time or recess. It acts as a release for them from the pressures of learning during the day. They know that time on the playground is their own time.

A type of playground called a playscape can provide children with the necessary feeling of ownership that Moore describes above.  Playscapes can also provide parents with the assurance of their child's safety and wellbeing, which may not be prevalent in an open field or wooded area.

Funding

In the UK, several organisations exist that help provide funding for schools and local authorities to construct playgrounds. These include the Biffa Award, which provides funding under the Small Grants Scheme; Funding Central, which offers support for voluntary organisations and social enterprises; and the Community Construction Fund, a flagship programme by Norfolk County Council.

Safety
Safety, in the context of playgrounds, is generally understood as the prevention of injuries.  Risk aversion and fear of lawsuits on the part of the adults who design playgrounds prioritizes injury prevention above other factors, such as cost or developmental benefit to the users. It is important that children gradually develop the skill of risk assessment, and a completely safe environment does not allow that.

Sometimes the safety of playgrounds is disputed in school or among regulators.  Over at least the last twenty years, the kinds of equipment to be found in playgrounds has changed, often towards safer equipment built with plastic.  For example, an older jungle gym might be constructed entirely from steel bars, while newer ones tend to have a minimal steel framework while providing a web of nylon ropes for children to climb on. Playgrounds with equipment that children may fall off often use rubber mulch on the ground to help cushion the impact.

Playgrounds are also made differently for different age groups. Often schools have a playground that is taller and more advanced for older schoolchildren and a lower playground with less risk of falling for younger children.

Safety discussions do not normally include an evaluation of the unintended consequences of injury prevention, such as older children who do not exercise at the playground because the playground is too boring.

Safety efforts sometimes paradoxically increase the likelihood and severity of injuries because of how people choose to use playground equipment.  For example, older children may choose to climb on the outside of a "safe" but boring play structure, rather than using it the way the designers intended.  Similarly, rather than letting young children play on playground slides by themselves, some injury-averse parents seat the children on the adult's lap and go down the slide together.  This seems safer at first glance, but if the child's shoe catches on the edge of the slide, this arrangement frequently results in the child's leg being broken.  If the child had been permitted to use the slide independently, then this injury would not happen, because when the shoe caught, the child would have stopped sliding rather than being propelled down the slide by the adult's weight.

Also concerning the safety of playgrounds is the material in which they are built. Wooden playgrounds act as a more natural environment for the children to play but can cause even more minor injuries.  Slivers are the main concern when building with wood material.  Wet weather is also a threat to children playing on wooden structures.  Most woods are treated and do not wear terribly fast, but with enough rain, wooden playgrounds can become slippery and dangerous for children to be on.

Regulation
In the United States, the Consumer Product Safety Commission and the American National Standards Institute have created a Standardized Document and Training System for certification of Playground Safety Inspectors. These regulations are nationwide and provide a basis for safe playground installation and maintenance practices. ASTM F1487-07 deals with specific requirements regarding issues such as play ground layout, use zones, and various test criteria for determining play ground safety. ASTM F2373 covers public use play equipment for children 6–24 months old.  This information can be applied effectively only by a trained C.P.S.I. A National Listing of Trained Playground Safety Inspectors is available for many states. A Certified Playground Safety Inspector (CPSI) is a career that was developed by the National Playground Safety Institute (NPSI) and is recognized nationally by the National Recreation and Park Association or N.R.P.A. (Some information sources offer  interactive examples of playground equipment that violates CPSC guidelines.)

In Australia, Standards Australia is responsible for the publication of the playground safety Standards AS/NS4422, AS/NZS4486.1 and AS4685 Parts 1 to 6. The University of Technology Sydney is responsible for the training and accreditation of playground inspectors. The Register of Playground Inspectors Australia lists all the individuals who have been certified to inspector playgrounds within Australia.

European Standards EN 1177 specifies the requirements for surfaces used in playgrounds. For each material type and height of equipment it specifies a minimum depth of material required. EN 1176 covers playground equipment standards. In the UK, playground inspectors can sit the examinations of the Register of Play Inspectors International at the three required levels - routine, operational and annual. Annual inspectors are able to undertake the post-installation inspections recommended by EN 1176.

Prevention strategies
Because the majority of playground injuries are due to falls from equipment, injury prevention efforts are primarily directed at reducing the likelihood of a child falling and reducing the likelihood of a severe injury if the child does fall.  This is done by:
 reducing the maximum fall height of equipment, primarily by reducing the overall height of anything a child might climb on or into;
 reducing the likelihood of falling from equipment, through using barriers, discouraging climbing, and making upper surfaces inconvenient or uncomfortable for climbing or sitting on; and
 installing a more flexible surface under and around play equipment, so that a child who falls is less likely to break a bone.

How effective these strategies are at preventing injuries is debated by experts, because when playgrounds are made from padded materials, children often take more risks.

Playground injury

Each year in the United States, emergency departments treat more than 200,000 children ages 14 and younger for playground-related injuries.  Approximately 156,040 (75.8%) of the 1999 injuries occurred on equipment designed for public use; 46,930 (22.8%) occurred on equipment designed for home use; and 2,880 (1.4%) occurred on homemade playground equipment (primarily rope swings).

Percentage of injuries involving public equipment
 About 46% occurred in schools.
 About 31% occurred in public parks.
 About 10% occurred in commercial childcare centers.
 About 3% occurred in home childcare.
 About 3% occurred in apartment complexes.
 About 2% occurred in fast food restaurants.
 About 9% occurred in other locations.

From January 1990 to August 2000, CPSC received reports of 147 deaths to children younger than 15 that involved playground equipment.

 70% of those deaths occurred in home
 30% of those deaths occurred in public use

Girls were involved in a slightly higher percentage of injuries (55%) than were boys (45%).

Injuries to the head and face accounted for 49% of injuries to children 0-4, while injuries to the arm and hand accounted for 49% of injuries to children ages 5–14. Approximately 15% of the injuries were classified as severe, with 3% requiring hospitalization.  The most prevalent diagnoses were fractures (39%), lacerations (22%), contusions/abrasions (20%), strains/sprains (11%).

For children ages 0–4, climbers (40%) had the highest incidence rates, followed by slides (33%).  For children ages 5–14, climbing equipment (56%) had the highest incidence rates, followed by swings (24%). Most injuries on public playground equipment were associated with climbing equipment (53%), swings (19%), and slides (17%).

Falls to the surface was a contributing factor in 79% of all injuries. On home equipment, 81% were associated with falls.

In 1995, playground-related injuries among children ages 14 and younger cost an estimated $1.2 billion.

On public playgrounds, more injuries occur on climbers than on any other equipment. On home playgrounds, swings are responsible for most injuries.

Playgrounds in low-income areas have more maintenance-related hazards than playgrounds in high-income areas. For example, playgrounds in low-income areas had significantly more trash, rusty play equipment, and damaged fall surfaces.

Unintended consequences
As a result of what some experts say is overprotectiveness driven by a fear of lawsuits, playgrounds have been designed to be, or at least to appear, excessively safe.  This overprotectiveness may protect the playground owner from lawsuits, but it appears to result in a decreased sense of achievement and increased fears in children.

The equipment limitations result in the children receiving less value from the play time.  The enclosed, padded, constrained, low structures prevent the child from taking risks and developing a sense of mastery over his or her environment.  Successfully taking a risk is empowering to children.  For example, a child climbing to the top of a tall jungle gym feels happy about successfully managing the challenging climb to the top, and he experiences the thrill of being in a precarious, high position.  By contrast, the child on a low piece of equipment, designed to reduce the incidence of injuries from falls, experiences no such thrill, sense of mastery, or accomplishment.  Additionally, a lack of experience with heights as a child is associated with increased acrophobia (fear of heights) in adults.

The appearance of safety encourages unreasonable risk-taking in children, who might take more reasonable risks if they correctly understood that it is possible to break a bone on the soft surfaces under most modern equipment.

Finally, the playground that is designed to appear low-risk is boring, especially to older children.  As a result, they tend to seek out alternative play areas, which may be very unsafe.

Risk management is an important life skill, and risk aversion in playgrounds is unhelpful in the long term. Experts studying child development such as Tim Gill have written about the over-protective bias in provision for children, particularly with playgrounds.  Instead of a constructed playground, allowing children to play in a natural environment such as open land or a park is sometimes recommended; children gain a better sense of balance playing on uneven ground, and learn to interpret the complexity and signals of nature more effectively.

Types

Playgrounds can be:
Built by collaborative support of corporate and community resources to achieve an immediate and visible improvement to the neighborhood.
Public, free of charge, typically found at elementary schools
Connected to a business and for customers only, such as those a McDonald's, IKEA, and Chuck E. Cheese's.
Commercial enterprises charging an entrance fee, such as Discovery Zone.
Non-profit organizations for edutainment as children's museums and science centers, some charge admission, some are free.

Inclusive playgrounds
Universally designed playgrounds are created to be accessible to all children.  There are three primary components to a higher level of inclusive play:
 physical accessibility;
 age and developmental appropriateness; and
 sensory-stimulating activity.

Some children with disabilities or developmental differences do not interact with playgrounds in the same way as typical children.  A playground designed without considering these children's needs may not be accessible or interesting to them.

Most efforts at inclusive playgrounds have been aimed at accommodating wheelchair users.  For example, rubber paths and ramps replace sand pits and steps, and some features are placed at ground level.  Efforts to accommodate children on the autism spectrum, who may find playgrounds overstimulating or who may have difficulty interacting with other children, have been less common.

Natural playgrounds

"Natural playgrounds" are play environments that blend natural materials, features, and indigenous vegetation with creative landforms to create purposely complex interplays of natural, environmental objects in ways that challenge and fascinate children and teach them about the wonders and intricacies of the natural world while they play within it.

Play components may include earth shapes (sculptures), environmental art, indigenous vegetation (trees, shrubs, grasses, flowers, lichens, mosses), boulders or other rock structures, dirt and sand, natural fences (stone, willow, wooden), textured pathways, and natural water features.

Themed and educational playgrounds 
Some playgrounds have specific purposes.  A traffic park teaches children how to navigate streets safely.  An adventure playground encourages open-ended play, sometimes involving potentially dangerous objects such as fire or hand tools.  An obstacle course or ropes course is designed to focus participants' attention on accomplishing a pre-determined challenging physical task.  A trampoline park provides trampolines.

Playgrounds for adults

China and some countries in Europe have playgrounds designed for adults.  These are outdoor spaces that feature fitness equipment designed for use primarily by adults, such as chin-up bars.

Playgrounds for older adults are popular in China.  Seniors are the primary users of public playgrounds in China.  These playgrounds are usually in a smaller, screened area, which may reduce the feeling of being watched or judged by others.  They often have adult-sized equipment that helps seniors stretch, strengthen muscles, and improve their sense of balance.  Similar playgrounds for adults have been built in other countries.  Berlin's Preußenpark for example is designed for people aged 70 or higher.

See also 
 Buddy bench
 Chin-up bar
 Children's street culture
 Children Youth and Environments Journal
 Cold War playground equipment
 Home zone/Play street
 Playground game
 Playground song
 Playground Surfacing
 Playscape
 Playtime
 Playwork
 Recess (break)
 Rubber Mulch

References

Ajzen, I. (1991). The theory of planned behaviour. Organisational Behaviour and Human Decision Processes, 50, 179-211.
Biddle, S. J., & Mutrie, N. (2001). Psychology of physical activity: Determinants, well-being and interventions. Abingdon: Routledge.
Ekeland, E., Heian, M., & Hagen, K.B. (2005). Can exercise improve self-esteem in children and young people? A systematic review of randomised controlled trials. British Journal of Sports Medicine, 39, 792-798.
Department of Health (2004). The benefits of regular physical activity. A report from the Chief Medical Officer. At least five days a week: evidence on the impact of physical activity and its relationship to health. Retrieved September 25, 2006 from http://www.dh.gov/PublicationsAndStatistics/Publications/ PublicationsPolicyAndGuidance/PublicationsPolicyAndGuidanceArticles/fs/en?CONTENT_ID=40809948chk=1Ft1Of.

External links 

National Program for Playground Safety – U.S. clearinghouse for playground safety information
 The Overprotected Kid – article about adventure playgrounds in The Atlantic
Benefits of living within walking distance of a park at The New York Times

 
Play (activity)
Outdoor recreation
Parks